Simo Kuismanen (22 July 1932 – 21 October 2015) was a Finnish sprint canoeist who competed in the late 1950s and early 1960s. Competing in two Summer Olympics, he earned his best finish of seventh in the K-2 10000 m event at Melbourne in 1956. He was born in Sortavala.

References
Simo Kuismanen's profile at Sports Reference.com

1932 births
2015 deaths
People from Sortavala
Canoeists at the 1956 Summer Olympics
Canoeists at the 1960 Summer Olympics
Finnish male canoeists
Olympic canoeists of Finland